TxTag , operated by the Texas Department of Transportation (TxDOT), is one of three interoperable electronic toll collection systems in Texas. The system is also interoperable with the K-TAG system used in Kansas and the Pikepass system used in Oklahoma.

Current system status
The TxTag brand name is used on the following highways:
 Operated by TxDOT:
the Central Texas Turnpike System, which encompasses SH 130, bypassing Austin to the east, SH 45, an east–west road roughly straddling the Austin-Round Rock boundary, and the northern portion of Loop 1 (Mopac) on Austin's north side
Loop 49, bypass of Tyler.
SH 99 a.k.a.. Grand Parkway the third loop around Houston (partial).
 Operated by the Central Texas Regional Mobility Authority:
183A, a toll bypass of US 183 through Leander. CTRMA is planning several other toll road projects throughout the Austin metropolitan area, which are planned to accept TxTag.

Interoperability
In 2003, all Greater Houston area toll-roads operated by Harris County Toll Road Authority and Fort Bend County Toll Road Authority (EZ TAG), and all Dallas–Fort Worth metroplex area toll-roads operated by North Texas Tollway Authority (TollTag) became compatible with TxTag, with the exception of Dallas/Fort Worth International Airport and Dallas Love Field airport parking, where NTTA's TollTag is the only ETC system recognized.

On May 17, 2017, the Kansas Turnpike Authority made TxTag compatible with the K-TAG system used on the Kansas Turnpike.

On May 7, 2019, the Oklahoma Turnpike Authority made TxTag compatible with the PikePass system used on all of Oklahoma's turnpikes.

NationalPass provides interoperability with systems outside Texas.

TxTag transponders are currently not accepted at tolled border crossings with Mexico, although future interoperability is planned with the Laredo Trade Tag accepted at four crossings. TxTag is not compatible with transponders from the E-ZPass system, although the two companies have been in talks with each other.

Technology
TxTag uses at least two types of transponders manufactured by TransCore: legacy hard case AT5100 transponders and newer eGo Plus flexible sticker-type transponders.  The transponders are mounted on the inside of the vehicle at the top center of the windshield.  The TxTag sticker can be used as a portable device, provided it is affixed to a small square of glass instead of a windshield. According to the patent for the device, the sticker was specifically designed such that if removed, among other things capacitor 66 is decoupled from 64, preventing the use of the sticker if it is torn from the glass.  It would also appear the sticker can be simply taped to the inside of the windshield for temporary use.

See also 

 E-ZPass used in 14 states, mostly in the East, as well as in Ontario
 EZ TAG
 Fastrak used in California
 GeauxPass used in Louisiana
 I-Pass used in Illinois
 K-Tag used in Kansas
 NationalPass provides interoperability with TransCore systems outside of Texas
 Peach Pass used in Georgia
 Pikepass used in Oklahoma
 Sunpass used in Florida
 TollTag
 Texas tollways

References

External links
Texas Department of Transportation - TxTag
Harris County Toll Road Authority - EZ TAG
North Texas Tollway Authority - TollTag
TransCore Patent

Electronic toll collection
Transportation in Texas